Kronprinsessegade (lit. "Crown Princess Street") is a street in central  Copenhagen, Denmark. Noted for its fine Neoclassical houses, it extends from Gothersgade and runs along the southern boundary of Rosenborg Castle Garden, passing Sølvgade and the Nyboder district of old naval barracks before finally joining Øster Voldgade close to Østerport Station. The David Collection, a museum which displays a large collection of Islamic art as well as Danish and European fine and applied arts, is based at No. 30.

History

Origins

After the Copenhagen Fire of 1795, which destroyed large parts of the city, there was an urgent need for new housing. Instigated by his consort, Crown Princess Marie Sophie, Crown Prince Frederik (VI) made an 89 ell (55.8 meter) strip along the southern boundary of Rosenborg Castle Garden available for the establishment of a new street which was to connect Gothersgade to Sølvgade.

The new street was named Kronprinsessegade in honour of Crown Princess Marie Sophie, who had first conceived the idea. At the same time, the name complied with the practice in the area of naming streets after Danish territorial possessions, royalty and the upper classes, including nobility, which originated in the 1649 plan for the New Copenhagen extension of the fortified city.

City architect Peter Meyn (1749–1808) and Jørgen Henrich Rawert (1751–1823) were put in charge of the project which began in 1799. The row of houses along the south side of the street was completed over the next two decades. The architect Johan Martin Quist is one of the large contributors to this oldest section of Kronprinsessegade with No. 6 (1803–06), 8-10 (1803–04), 12-14 (1805–06), 16 (1806–07) and 18 (1807–13). Andreas Hallander designed No. 20 (1805–06, with J. H. Rawert), 22, 24 (1807–08, with A. C. Wilcken) and Kronprinsessegades Barracks at No. 46 (extension 1805-07, with J. H. Rawert).

Wrought-iron grill and pavilions

Peter Meyn was also charged with the design of a barrier towards the royal garden along the north side of the new street. He had just returned from Paris where he had been struck by the Pont-Neuf with its iron grill and many small shops, and the street life which surrounded it. With this as an inspiration, he designed the new grill along the edge of the park with 12 small shop pavilions, each six ells wide, six ells deep and six ells tall. It was completed in 1806.

Among the goods which were sold from the pavilions were cakes and stockings. Later they were made available to architects and artists from the Royal Arts Academy as a sort of grant.

Extension and later history
From  1869 on, parts of Nyboder had been demolished and from 1870 to 1872 the Workers' Building Society constructed their third development of terraced houses in the grounds. The first of the building society's developments was designed by Frederik Bøttger. It became a sort of pilot project for the later, larger and more prominent developments built to his design, the Kartoffelrækkerne in Østerbro and the Humleby in Vesterbro.

In 1931 a property was demolished in Sølvgade to continue Kronprinsessegade eastwards, past Nyboder and the Building Society's houses, all the way to Øster Voldgade at Nyboder School.

Architecture
The houses along the oldest section of the street, facing Rosenborg Castle Garden, are mostly built in a Neoclassical style typical of the construction boom during the decades after the Great Fire of 1795 and which still dominates in much of central Copenhagen. The architect, architectural writer and urban planner Steen Eiler Rasmussen has given the following characterisation of the street:

Kronprinsessegade today

Kronprinsessegade is today generally a quiet residential street with the David Collection as its main point of interest for visitors.

The pavilions are today rented out by the Palaces and Properties Agency on two-years leases with possibility of extension. There is a required minimum opening time of 20 hours per week. They need to be relevant to the site's history while being placed in a contemporary context. A larger building in the gardens, halfway along the street, houses the restaurant Orangeriet which has a Bib Gourmand in the Michelin Guide.

Also on Kronprinsessegade is Kokkeriet, which holds one Michelin star.

Commemorative plaques
A plaque on No. 36 commemorates that the composer Christoph Ernst Friedrich Weyse lived in the building from 1825.

Cultural references
Benjamin Jacobsen's fictional memoirs Midt i en klunketid (1955), Bedstemor går igen (1956) and Glade dage i Kronprinsessegade (1979) follows an iooer-class family in Kronprinsessegade in the 1890s.

See also
 Adelgade
 Borgergade
 Kronprinsensgade
 Kronprinsessegade 8

References

External links

 Guide to the pavilions (in Danish)
 The David Collection, official website (in English)
 1840 census
 1850 census
 Kronprinsessegade fence and pavilions

 Source

Streets in Copenhagen